Sir John D'Oyly, 1st Baronet (6 June 1774 – 25 May 1824) was a British colonial administrator.

Life
He was the second son of Matthias D'Oyly, Archdeacon of Hastings and his wife Mary. He was educated at Westminster School and matriculated at Corpus Christi College, Cambridge in 1793, graduating B.A. in 1796, M.A. in 1799.

D'Oyly went out to Ceylon in 1801, initially as a writer in the civil service and then as President of various provincial courts. He mastered the Sinhalese language during a tenure at Matara under the tutelage of the scholarly Buddhist Monk; Karathota Dhammarama Nayake Thera, and for this proficiency, he was appointed as the Government's chief translator in 1805. He became an Agent of Revenue for the District of Colombo the following year. Further promotions saw him elevated through the ranks of civil and military and he was ultimately appointed to the post of Civil Auditor-General.

D'Oyly had a key role in arranging for the British takeover of the Kandyan kingdom in 1815. Being fluent in Sinhala, he was the intermediary between the British Governor Thomas Maitland and the disaffected Kandyan chiefs who were intriguing to "sell out" the king, Sri Vikrama Rajasinha. D'Oyly is credited with drafting the Kandyan Convention of March 2, 1815 which set out the terms of the accession.

He was created a baronet in 1821 and chose to stay in Kandy, eventually dying there in 1824. A Briton who visited Kandy before 1815 had described him as living like a "Cingalese hermit". His earlier association with a woman poet, Gajaman Nona, in Matara led to some speculation.

He died in 1824 and was buried in Garrison Cemetery, Kandy. His Obituary, from the Ceylon Gazette of May 29, 1824, read:

References

 

1774 births
1824 deaths
People educated at Westminster School, London
Alumni of the University of Cambridge
Baronets in the Baronetage of the United Kingdom
People of the Kingdom of Kandy
Sri Lankan people of British descent
Auditors General of Sri Lanka
British colonial governors and administrators in Asia
Ceylonese baronets